Helen Fagerström (born 17 March 1977) is a retired Swedish footballer. Fagerström was part of the Djurgården Swedish champions' team of 2003 and 2004. She was involved in a confrontation with Marta during a football match for which Marta apologised.

Honours

Club 
 Djurgården/Älvsjö 
 Damallsvenskan (2): 2003, 2004

References

Swedish women's footballers
Djurgårdens IF Fotboll (women) players
1977 births
Living people
Women's association footballers not categorized by position